Philipp Hofmann (born 30 March 1993) is a German professional footballer who plays for VfL Bochum as a forward.

Hofmann is a product of the Schalke 04 academy and made his professional breakthrough away from the club on loan, before transferring to 1. FC Kaiserslautern in 2014. Following two years in England with Brentford between 2015 and 2017, he returned to Germany and forged a career in the 2. Bundesliga with Greuther Fürth, Eintracht Braunschweig and Karlsruher SC. An average of a goal every other game during three seasons with Karlsruher SC led to a transfer to the Bundesliga with VfL Bochum in 2022. Hofmann scored 18 goals in 36 caps for Germany between U18 and U21 level.

Club career

Schalke 04 
A forward, Hofmann began his career as a youth with local clubs RW Wenholthausen and SC Neheim, before signing for Bundesliga club Schalke 04 in 2009. He won the Westfalenpokalsieger with the U19 team in the 2010–11 season and the U19 Bundesliga the following year. He made 24 appearances for the reserve team in the 2011–12 season, scoring six goals. Hofmann won his first and only first team call up for a dead rubber Europa League match versus Maccabi Haifa on 14 December 2011 and remained an unused substitute during the 3–0 victory.

Hofmann spent the 2012–13 season on loan with 2. Bundesliga club SC Paderborn 07 and made the first professional appearance of his career in a 4–0 victory over VfL Bochum on 11 August 2012, as a late substitute for Diego Demme. He made 31 appearances and scored six goals in a mid-table season. On 14 July 2013, Hofmann joined 2. Bundesliga club FC Ingolstadt 04 on a two-year loan. He made 33 appearances and scored 9 goals during the 2013–14 season and notably scored two hat-tricks in three Regionalliga Bayern appearances for the reserves. Hofmann's loan was terminated at the end of the 2013–14 season and he departed Schalke on 5 June 2014.

1. FC Kaiserslautern 
Hofmann transferred to 2. Bundesliga club 1. FC Kaiserslautern on 5 June 2014. He began the 2014–15 season in a substitute role and scored on his debut in a 3–2 win over TSV 1860 Munich on 4 August 2014, scoring the winner just a minute after replacing the scorer of the Red Devils' opening two goals, Srđan Lakić. Hofmann won unfortunate media attention for missing a certain goalscoring opportunity from one yard versus Union Berlin on 24 September, but was spared his blushes after Union failed to cancel out Alexander Ring's first half goal. Hofmann failed to come into regular goalscoring form and finished the 2014–15 season with 32 appearances and 9 goals as the Red Devils finished just two points shy of the promotion playoff place. He departed the Fritz-Walter-Stadion in July 2015.

Brentford 

On 23 July 2015, Hofmann moved to England to sign a three-year contract with Championship club Brentford, for an undisclosed fee  During an injury-hit 2015–16 season, Hofmann scored four goals in 22 appearances. He returned free from injury for the 2016–17 pre-season, but began the season overweight and behind Scott Hogan and Lasse Vibe in competition for the team's lone forward role. After slimming down and making just five substitute appearances by early December, head coach Dean Smith challenged Hofmann to work harder to earn a starting place. Despite the departure of Scott Hogan in January 2017, a niggling back injury and a lack of match fitness rendered Hofmann unable to challenge for a starting berth during the second half of the season. He fell behind B team forward Justin Shaibu in the pecking order and finished the season with 11 appearances and no goals. Hofmann departed Brentford in June 2017, after scoring just four goals in 33 appearances during his two seasons at Griffin Park.

Greuther Fürth 
On 13 June 2017, Hofmann returned to Germany to join 2. Bundesliga club Greuther Fürth on a three-year contract for an undisclosed fee. After recovering from a medial collateral ligament injury suffered during pre-season, he made his debut for the club in a DFB-Pokal first round match versus SV Morlautern on 13 August 2017 and scored two goals in the 5–0 victory. Prior to the winter break, Hofmann made just 11 appearances (scoring three goals) and departed the Sportpark Ronhof prior to the resumption of the 2017–18 season in January 2018.

Eintracht Braunschweig 
On 23 January 2018, Hofmann transferred to 2. Bundesliga club Eintracht Braunschweig on a -year contract. He scored 12 goals in 52 appearances before his departure at the end of the 2018–19 season.

Karlsruher SC 
On 11 June 2019, Hofmann transferred to newly promoted 2. Bundesliga club Karlsruher SC on a two-year contract, with one-year option. He scored 53 goals in 104 appearances during three seasons at the Wildparkstadion and was released when his contract expired at the end of the 2021–22 season.

VfL Bochum 
On 4 May 2022, Hofmann signed a two-year contract with Bundesliga club VfL Bochum on a free transfer, effective 1 July 2022.

International career 
Hofmann represented Germany between U18 and U21 level. He made his international debut for the U18 team in a 3–2 friendly win over France on 22 March 2011, replacing goalscorer Amin Younes in the second half. He made two further U18 appearances before making his U19 debut with a start in a 5–3 friendly win over Belgium on 1 September 2011, being replaced by Niclas Füllkrug at half time. He scored his first international goal in another friendly three days later, with what looked to be the winner versus rivals the Netherlands, before Ouasim Bouy salvaged a 2–2 draw. Hofmann scored six goals in six games during Germany's unsuccessful qualification period for the 2012 European U19 Championship.

Hofmann scored two goals in four friendly appearances for the U20 team during the 2012–13 season and made his U21 debut in a 4–0 2015 European U21 Championship qualifying win over the Republic of Ireland on 9 September 2013. He showed excellent form during the qualifying period, scoring seven goals in 10 games, but he failed to score in his two finals appearances before Germany were humiliated 5–0 by Portugal in the semi-finals. He scored 9 goals in 17 matches at U21 level.

Personal life 
Hofmann attended the Gesamtschule Berger Feld.

Career statistics

References

External links

Philipp Hofmann at vfl-bochum.de

1993 births
Living people
People from Arnsberg
Sportspeople from Arnsberg (region)
Association football forwards
German footballers
Germany youth international footballers
Germany under-21 international footballers
FC Schalke 04 II players
FC Schalke 04 players
SC Paderborn 07 players
FC Ingolstadt 04 players
1. FC Kaiserslautern players
Brentford F.C. players
SpVgg Greuther Fürth players
German expatriate footballers
German expatriate sportspeople in England
2. Bundesliga players
Regionalliga players
English Football League players
Expatriate footballers in England
Eintracht Braunschweig players
People educated at the Gesamtschule Berger Feld
3. Liga players
Footballers from North Rhine-Westphalia
FC Ingolstadt 04 II players
Karlsruher SC players
VfL Bochum players
Bundesliga players